The Sacred Heart Cathedral, also called Chiang Mai Cathedral, is a  Catholic Church located in Chiang Mai, Thailand.  The cathedral follows the Roman or Latin rite.

History
The present church is the third structure that serves as the cathedral of the diocese, and was inaugurated on October 30, 1999. The first church dedicated to the Sacred Heart was built in 1931. A new and larger church was inaugurated on February 28, 1965 as the principal church of the Diocese of Chiang Mai (Dioecesis Chiangmaiensis, สังฆมณฑลเชียงใหม่), which was created in the same year by bull "Qui in fastigio" of Pope Paul VI.

Ancillary buildings
The Sacred Heart School and a kindergarten surround the church building, having been added in 1932.

See also
Roman Catholicism in Thailand
Sacred Heart Cathedral (disambiguation)

References

Roman Catholic cathedrals in Thailand
Buildings and structures in Chiang Mai
Roman Catholic churches completed in 1999
1931 establishments in Siam
20th-century Roman Catholic church buildings in Thailand